Martin Gabel (June 19, 1911 – May 22, 1986) was an American actor, film director and film producer.

Life and career

Gabel was born in Philadelphia, Pennsylvania, to Rebecca and Isaac Gabel, a jeweler, both Jewish immigrants. He married Arlene Francis on May 14, 1946, and they had a son named Peter Gabel.

One of Gabel's earliest noted roles was as Neil Williams, a newspaper reporter, on the radio serial comedy Easy Aces in the mid-to-late 1930s. Gabel's most noted work was as narrator and host of the May 8, 1945, CBS Radio broadcast of Norman Corwin's epic dramatic poem On a Note of Triumph, a commemoration of the fall of the Nazi regime in Germany and the end of World War II in Europe. The broadcast was so popular that the CBS, NBC, Blue and Mutual networks broadcast a second live production of the program on May 13. The Columbia Masterworks record label subsequently published an album of the May 13 production. The production became the title focus of the Academy Award-winning short film A Note of Triumph: The Golden Age of Norman Corwin in 2005, the 60th anniversary year of the broadcast.

Gabel was first associated with Orson Welles when he played Javert in his six-part radio adaptation of Les Misérables (1937). He became one of the original members of Welles's Mercury Theatre repertory company. On the stage Gabel portrayed Cassius in Caesar (1937), a critically acclaimed modern-dress adaptation of Shakespeare's tragedy streamlined into an anti-fascist tour de force, and starred as Danton in Danton's Death (1938). On radio, he played Professor Van Helsing in "Dracula" (1938), the debut episode of The Mercury Theatre on the Air.

In 1947, he directed his only film, The Lost Moment. Gabel appeared in few films over his career, usually in small roles. A notable large supporting part was as crime boss Tomas Rienzi in Richard Brooks's Deadline U.S.A. (1952), starring Humphrey Bogart. Gabel played another mob figure in a Frank Sinatra private-detective film, Lady in Cement (1968), then co-starred again with Sinatra in Contract on Cherry Street and The First Deadly Sin.

Gabel won the 1961 Tony Award for Best Performance by a Featured Actor for the comedy Big Fish, Little Fish; he was also noted for his performances in the Broadway productions of Baker Street, in which he played Professor Moriarty; The Rivalry, in which he played Stephen A. Douglas.

Gabel played businessman Mr. Strutt in Alfred Hitchcock's Marnie (1964), and the psychiatrist in the Billy Wilder version of The Front Page (1974) with Walter Matthau and Jack Lemmon. He was a frequent guest panelist on the popular CBS Television Sunday night game show What's My Line?, on which his wife, Arlene Francis, was a regular panelist.

Death
Gabel died in New York City from a heart attack on May 22, 1986, aged 74.

Selected theatre credits

 Caesar (1937–1938) as Cassius
 Danton's Death (1938) as Danton
 Will Success Spoil Rock Hunter? (1955–1956) as Irving LaSalle
 Once More, With Feeling (1958–1959) (producer)
 Big Fish, Little Fish (1961) as Basil Smythe
 Baker Street (1965) as Professor Moriarty
 Sheep on the Runway (1970) as Joseph Mayflower
 In Praise of Love (1973–1975) as Mark Walters

Filmography

References

External links

 
 

1911 births
1986 deaths
Male actors from Philadelphia
American male film actors
Film directors from Pennsylvania
Film producers from New York (state)
American male stage actors
American male television actors
American male radio actors
Jewish American male actors
Tony Award winners
20th-century American male actors
20th-century American businesspeople
Film producers from Pennsylvania
20th-century American Jews